For the 2019 Rugby World Cup, there were several play-off matches during the qualification process in order to determine which nations would compete in the Repechage. Canada, who failed to be one of the three teams to advance from the Americas qualification process, despite being the third highest ranked team in the Americas, emerged from the repechage process in November 2018 to become the final team to qualify for the World Cup.

Format

Europe/Oceania
The qualification play-off was a home and away series between Europe 2 and Oceania 3. Europe 2, Germany, was the winner of Round 6 of the European qualification process, while Oceania 3, Samoa, was the third best team of Round 1 of the Oceania qualification process. The winner of this home and away play-off on aggregate qualified to the World Cup as the play-off winner. The loser gained another chance via the World Repechage.

Repechage

Asia/Oceania
Prior to the repechage final, Asia 1 and Oceania 4 played-off in a home and away series for the final place. Asia 1 was the winner of Round 3 of the Asian qualification process, while Oceania 4 is Cook Islands. The Cook Islands advanced to the next stage of qualifying for the 2019 Rugby World Cup after Tahiti, the winner of Round 2 of the Oceania qualification process, were found to have breached player eligibility regulations in their Oceania Cup clash the previous year. The winner of this home and away play-off on aggregate, qualified for a place in the World Repechage, while the loser missed out on World Cup qualification.

Final tournament
The 2019 Rugby World Cup repechage tournament was hosted by a neutral venue: the Pierre-Delort Stadium in Marseille, France. In previous years, the repechage, a last-chance opportunity to qualify for the Rugby World Cup, has followed a knock-out format in line with the rest of the qualification process. The 2019 edition, however, was a round-robin tournament between four teams held during the November test window. Africa and the Americas were guaranteed a repechage place, with the runner-up of the African qualification round 3 (Africa 2) and the losing side of the Americas Repechage play-off gaining positions. The final two places were decided through the above cross-regional play-offs, with the loser of the Europe/Oceania play-off (Europe 2 or Oceania 3) getting another shot at qualification in the repechage, and the winner of the Asia/Oceania play-off for repechage, advancing to the repechage, with no direct place for an Asian team or the lower ranked teams in Oceania. The winner of the World Repechage qualified for the World Cup as the play-off winner (or Repechage 2).

Teams
Six teams progressed to the regional and Repechage play-offs for the final two non-regional seeds in the World Cup; teams world rankings are as per date progressing to the play-off phase and bold nations denotes teams had previously played in a Rugby World Cup.

Europe/Oceania qualifying play-off
Samoa played Germany in a Europe/Oceania play-off for direct qualification to the World Cup. Samoa qualified, winning 108–43 on aggregate, while Germany progressed to the Repechage as runners-up.

Repechage
On 12 July 2018, World Rugby announced that the repechage tournament would be hosted at the neutral venue of the Pierre-Delort Stadium in Marseille, France.

Asia/Oceania play-off
The winner of this home and away play-off, Hong Kong, earned the right to compete in the repechage after winning the series 77–3 on aggregate.

Repechage final tournament

Teams and table

Final standings (continental qualifying path of each team and world ranking in brackets):

Fixtures

Round 1

Round 2

Round 3

References

Rugby World Cup repechage qualifiers
2019 Rugby World Cup qualification
2018 rugby union tournaments for national teams